Acacia sphacelata is a shrub of the genus Acacia and the subgenus Phyllodineae that is endemic to south western Australia.

Description
Like most species of Acacia it has phyllodes rather than true leaves. The scattered, patent, linear or nearly lanceolate phyllodes form in whorls around the stem and have no stems. It blooms from April to September and produces yellow flowers. The showy spherical flower-heads contain 13 to 50 bright yellow flowers. After flowering papery to crustaceous seed pods form that have a narrowly oblong to linear shape.

Taxonomy
The species was first formally described by the botanist George Bentham in 1842 as part of the William Jackson Hooker work Notes on Mimoseae, with a synopsis of species as published in the London Journal of Botany. It was reclassified as Racosperma sphacelatum by Leslie Pedley in 2003 then transferred back to the Acacia genus in 2006. The only other synonyms are Acacia sphacelata var. sphacelata, Acacia tamminensis and Acacia spacelata.

There are three recognised subspecies:
 Acacia sphacelata subsp. recurva
 Acacia sphacelata subsp. sphacelata
 Acacia sphacelata subsp. verticillata

Distribution
It is native to an area in the Mid West, Wheatbelt and Goldfields-Esperance regions of Western Australia where it is often situated on undulating plains and lateritic rises where it grows in sandy, sandy-clay and loamy soils. The bulk of the population is found from around Port Gregory in the north west down to around the Stirling Range in the south and out to around Scaddan in the east.

See also
List of Acacia species

References

sphacelata
Acacias of Western Australia
Taxa named by George Bentham
Plants described in 1842